Stigmella boehmeriae is a moth of the family Nepticulidae. It is only known from Kyushu in Japan.

Adults are on wing from mid-April, late July and late August. There are probably four or more generations per year.

The larvae feed on Boehmeria nipononivea and Boehmeria spicata. They mine the leaves of their host plant. The mine is linear, slender and usually made on the distal part of the leaf, sometimes on apical serrations. It is pale brown with a compact blackish central frass line.

External links
Japanese Species of the Genus Stigmella (Nepticulidae: Lepidoptera)

Nepticulidae
Moths of Japan
Moths described in 1985